Fissurella emmanuelae is a species of sea snail, a marine gastropod mollusk in the family Fissurellidae, the keyhole limpets and slit limpets.

Distribution
This species occurs in the Atlantic Ocean off Brazil.

References

 Métivier, B., 1970. Campagne Calypso au large des côtes Atlantiques de l'Amérique du sud (1961-1962). I- 20. Mollusques prosobranches: Fissurellidae, Acumaeidae et Patellidae. Annales de l'Institut Océanographique 47(1969-1970): 115-125

External links
 To Encyclopedia of Life
 To World Register of Marine Species

Fissurellidae
Gastropods described in 1970